Amber Benson (born January 8, 1977) is an American actress, singer, writer, director, and producer. She is best known for her role as Tara Maclay on the TV series Buffy the Vampire Slayer (1999–2002), and has also directed, produced and starred in her own films Chance (2002) and Lovers, Liars & Lunatics (2006). She also starred in the movie Kiss the Bride (2007). She co-directed the film Drones (2010) with fellow Buffy cast member Adam Busch. Benson also starred as a waitress in the horror movie The Killing Jar (2010).

Early life
Benson was born January 8, 1977, in Birmingham, Alabama, the daughter of Diane and Edward Benson, a psychiatrist. She has a younger sister, Danielle, who is an artist. Her father is Jewish and her mother was raised Southern Baptist; Benson grew up attending a Reform synagogue in Alabama.

Career

Benson was 14 when she made her feature film debut in the Steven Soderbergh film King of the Hill.

Benson is best known for her recurring role as Tara Maclay on the television series Buffy the Vampire Slayer. The character first appeared in the season 4 episode "Hush" and soon became the girlfriend of Willow Rosenberg (Alyson Hannigan). Benson remained with the series until season 6 when her character was killed off. In her final episode, Benson was credited for the only time as a regular cast member.

Benson sang in the Buffy the Vampire Slayer musical episode "Once More, with Feeling". She provided vocals for the songs "I've Got a Theory/ Bunnies/If We're Together", "Under Your Spell" (her solo), "Walk Through the Fire", "Standing/Under Your Spell (Reprise)", and "Where Do We Go from Here?" In 2002, she performed two songs on Buffy colleague Anthony Stewart Head's album Music for Elevators. She also sang "Toucha Toucha Touch Me" (aka "Creature of the Night") at VH-1's celebrity karaoke tribute to The Rocky Horror Picture Show.

While still working on Buffy the Vampire Slayer, Benson co-wrote the movie The Theory of the Leisure Class with director Gabriel Bologna, released in 2001, and directed, produced, edited, and acted in a digital video feature called Chance (2002) which also featured her Buffy co-star James Marsters. She also collaborated with director James Kerwin in 2003 to produce her play Albert Hall in Hollywood.

In 2001, Benson worked with Golden, Terry Moore, and Eric Powell of Dark Horse Comics to create the Buffy the Vampire Slayer: Willow and Tara comic book titled "WannaBlessedBe". The following year (2002), she worked with Christopher Golden and AJ (Ajit Jothikaumar) of Dark Horse Comics to create the Buffy the Vampire Slayer: Willow and Tara comic books titled Wilderness #1 and Wilderness #2.

Benson and Christopher Golden produced and began a series of animated fantasy films for the BBC with the animation studio Cosgrove Hall. Ghosts of Albion: Legacy (2003) and its sequels are available on the BBC Cult website. Benson and Golden have also collaborated on two supernatural thrillers: Ghosts of Albion: Accursed and Ghosts of Albion: Witchery. These books follow the fortunes of Tamara and William Swift, who first appeared in the BBC computer animated web movie Ghosts of Albion: Legacy.

In 2003, she had a supporting role in Latter Days as Traci Levine, alongside Steve Sandvoss and Wes Ramsey.

In 2005, Benson collaborated with artist Jamie McKelvie on a short story within the Image Comics collection Four Letter Worlds. In 2006, Benson collaborated with artist Ben Templesmith on Demon Father John's Pinwheel Blues published by IDW as a four-part split-book, Shadowplay (with work by Ashley Wood and Christina Z.

In 2006, Benson released her second independent feature film Lovers, Liars & Lunatics through her own production company, Benson Entertainment. The film was shot on film and was partly financed by the sale of limited edition "Triangle" Tara Buffyverse action figure. The project, initially called "The Dirty Script," was ultimately titled Lovers, Liars and Lunatics by producer Diane Benson, Amber's mother.

In 2006, Benson also portrayed the "vegetarian" vampiress Lenore on the TV series Supernatural.

In December 2006, Benson and Golden released yet another collaboration, the short novel The Seven Whistlers which is distributed through Subterranean Press in a limited number of signed copies. In September 2007, Benson signed a three-book deal with Ginjer Buchanan of Penguin Books. Death's Daughter, was released by Ace Books on February 24, 2009; Cat's Claw, on February 23, 2010; and Serpent's Storm, in February 2011. On February 28, 2012, the fourth book in the series, How to Be Death was released.

Benson is the co-director with Adam Busch of the 2010 comedy film Drones.

In 2012, Benson played a young Judith Collins in the Dark Shadows audio drama "Dress Me in Dark Dreams". She guest starred in the second season of the Jane Espenson scripted romantic comedy web series, Husbands.

In June 2013, it was announced that Benson has been attached to star in the web TV series adaptation of The Morganville Vampires as Amelie, the founder of Morganville.

Benson narrated the 2014 audiobook Lock In by John Scalzi. In October 2014, she published her fantasy book The Witches of Echo Park.

Activism
During the 2008 campaign season, Benson was featured in a Barack Obama advertisement sponsored by MoveOn.org.

In February 2021, Benson spoke out in support of Buffy The Vampire Slayer co-star Charisma Carpenter's accusation of unprofessional and abusive behavior on the part of Buffy creator Joss Whedon, corroborating Carpenter's account by relating that the set of that series was a "toxic environment" whose traumatic effects upon those who worked there were long-lasting.

Personal life

As of 2007, Benson resided in Los Angeles. She described herself as a "lapsed vegetarian".

From 2002 to 2009, she dated Adam Busch, who played Warren Mears on Buffy the Vampire Slayer. The two have remained close friends.

Filmography

Film

Television

Bibliography

Books

Ghosts of Albion
with Christopher Golden

Calliope Reaper-Jones

Death's Daughter (February 24, 2009)
Cat's Claw (February 23, 2010)
Serpent's Storm (February 22, 2011)
How to be Death (February 28, 2012)
The Golden Age of Death (Feb 2013)

The Witches of Echo Park

The Last Dream Keeper (Jan 2016)
The End of Magic (May 2017)

Other books
 The Seven Whistlers (with Christopher Golden. 2006)
 Star and Marco's Guide to Mastering Every Dimension (with Dominic Bisignano, Disney Press, 2017)

Anthologies and collections

Comics

Buffy the Vampire Slayer
 WannaBlessedBe (Willow & Tara with Christopher Golden. 2003)
 Wilderness (with Christopher Golden)
 "The Innocent" in Tales of the Slayers

Other comics
 Shadowplay #1–4 (with Ben Templesmith. 2005)
 Among the Ghosts (with Sina Grace, illustrator. August 2010)
 Clueless: Senior Year (with Sarah Kuhn)
 Clueless: One Last Summer (with Sarah Kuhn)

Other media
 Illusions (with Christopher Golden. Animated feature, directed by Benson, available on the BBC website)
 The Ghosts of Albion Roleplaying Game (with Timothy S. Brannan and Christopher Golden. Eden Studios, 2007)
Middlegame by Seanan McGuire, narrated by Benson
Walkaway by Cory Doctorow, narrated by Benson
 Lock In by John Scalzi, narrated by Benson
 Head On by John Scalzi, narrated by Benson
 Swarm by Scott Westerfeld, narrated by Benson
 Zeroes by Scott Westerfeld, narrated by Benson

References

External links

 
 
 
 
 
 Bean, Krista (May 6, 2012). "Podcast #5: Amber Benson". Scripts & Scribes. 
 http://www.amberbenson.tv/

1977 births
Actresses from Birmingham, Alabama
Actresses from Orlando, Florida
American comics writers
American film actresses
American women film directors
American television actresses
Female comics writers
Living people
Jewish American actresses
Jewish American screenwriters
American women screenwriters
American fantasy writers
20th-century American actresses
21st-century American actresses
Film directors from Alabama
21st-century American novelists
American women novelists
Women science fiction and fantasy writers
21st-century American women writers
Screenwriters from Alabama
Novelists from Alabama
Screenwriters from Florida
American women film producers
Film producers from Florida
21st-century American screenwriters
Activists from Los Angeles
21st-century American Jews